Mogoy-Gorkhon is a rural locality (an ulus) in Tunkinsky District, Republic of Buryatia, Russia. The population was 88 as of 2010. There are 2 streets.

Geography 
Mogoy-Gorkhon is located 4 km west of Kyren (the district's administrative centre) by road. Khuzhiry is the nearest rural locality.

References 

Rural localities in Tunkinsky District